Nur Suryani Mohd Taibi (born 24 September 1982) is a Malaysian sports shooter. She competed in the Women's 10 metre air rifle event at the 2012 Summer Olympics. Taibi gained fame at the Games for being eight months pregnant. She did not advance beyond the qualification round.

References

External links
 

1982 births
Living people
Malaysian Muslims
Malaysian people of Malay descent
People from Perak
Malaysian female sport shooters
Olympic shooters of Malaysia
Shooters at the 2012 Summer Olympics
Shooters at the 2020 Summer Olympics
Asian Games medalists in shooting
Shooters at the 2006 Asian Games
Shooters at the 2010 Asian Games
Shooters at the 2014 Asian Games
Commonwealth Games bronze medallists for Malaysia
Asian Games silver medalists for Malaysia
Asian Games bronze medalists for Malaysia
Commonwealth Games medallists in shooting
Medalists at the 2010 Asian Games
Medalists at the 2014 Asian Games
Southeast Asian Games gold medalists for Malaysia
Southeast Asian Games silver medalists for Malaysia
Southeast Asian Games bronze medalists for Malaysia
Southeast Asian Games medalists in shooting
Shooters at the 2014 Commonwealth Games
Competitors at the 2011 Southeast Asian Games
Competitors at the 2013 Southeast Asian Games
Competitors at the 2015 Southeast Asian Games
Competitors at the 2017 Southeast Asian Games
Medallists at the 2014 Commonwealth Games